Théophile Rudolphe Studer (27 November 1845 – 12 February 1922) was a Swiss ornithologist and marine biologist.

From 1871 to 1922 he was a curator of zoological collections at the museum of natural history in Berne. In 1874–1876 he took part in a scientific journey aboard the German frigate "S.M.S. Gazelle". Two years after his return he was a professor of zoology and comparative anatomy at the school of veterinary medicine in Berne.

Published works 
With Victor Fatio (1838-1906), he published the first three installments of Catalogue des oiseaux de la Suisse (Catalogue of birds of Switzerland). Other writings by Studer include:
 Übersicht ūber die Ophiuriden welche während der Reise S.M.S. Gazelle um die Erde 1874-1876 gesammelt Wurden, 1882 - Overview of Ophiuroidea, collected by the S.M.S. Gazelle voyage of 1874–1876.
 Verzeichniss der Crustaceen welche während der Reise S.M.S. Gazelle an der Westküste von Afrika, Ascension und dem Cap der guten Hoffnung gesammelt wurden, 1882 - Directory of crustaceans, collected by the S.M.S. Gazelle voyage to the west coast of Africa, Ascension Island and the Cape of Good Hope.
 Isopoden, gesammelt während der Reise S.M.S. Gazelle um die Erde 1874-76, 1884 - Isopoda collected by the S.M.S. Gazelle voyage of 1874–76.
 Verzeichniss der während der Reise S.M.S. Gazelle um die Erde, 1874-1876, gesammelten Asteriden und Euryalideen, 1884 - Directory of the S.M.S. Gazelle voyage, collections of Asteridea and Euryalida.
 "Supplementary report on the Alcyonaria collected by H.M.S. Challenger during the years 1873-76", published in English in 1889.
 Fauna helvetica. Oiseaux, 1895 - Swiss fauna, birds.
 Fauna helvetica. Mollusques, 1896 - Swiss fauna, mollusks.

References 

Swiss ornithologists
19th-century Swiss zoologists
Academic staff of the University of Bern
1922 deaths
1845 births